Court Street Historic Residential District is a national historic district located at Fulton, Callaway County, Missouri.  It encompasses 84 contributing buildings in a predominantly residential section of Fulton.  It developed between about 1844 and 1945, and includes representative examples of Queen Anne, Second Empire, Colonial Revival, American Foursquare, and Bungalow style architecture.  Some of the buildings were designed by noted local architect Morris Frederick Bell.  Located in the district is the separately listed Brandon-Bell-Collier House.  Other notable buildings include the John W. Tucker Residence (1912), Klinginsmith Residence (c. 1900), Synodical College-Seminole Apartments (c. 1900/1930), Synodical College Dormitory-Seminole Apartments (1913), Gish Residence (c. 1950), Dave and Ida McCue House (c. 1910), First Presbyterian Church (c. 1885), Leland Waters Residence (c. 1923), Bauer House (c. 1883), and Martin-Harris House (c. 1843, 1866).

It was listed on the National Register of Historic Places in 2007.

References 

Historic districts on the National Register of Historic Places in Missouri
Second Empire architecture in Missouri
Queen Anne architecture in Missouri
Colonial Revival architecture in Missouri
Bungalow architecture in Missouri
Buildings and structures in Callaway County, Missouri
National Register of Historic Places in Callaway County, Missouri